Cheyna Lee Matthews (born 10 November 1993) is an American-born Jamaican professional footballer who plays as a forward for Racing Louisville of the National Women's Soccer League (NWSL) and the Jamaica women's national team.

College career

Vanderbilt
In 2012, Williams attended Vanderbilt University, where she would make 17 appearances, score six goals and register six assists her freshman year. Building on a successful season, she started all 18 games her sophomore year, scoring 16 goals and registering five assists. Her performance in 2013 named her First-Team All-SEC.

Florida State
In 2014, Williams transferred to Florida State University, where she would continue her form. She made 24 starts (26 appearances) and helped the Seminoles win their first NCAA National Championship in program history. Williams would finish her season year with an additional 25 games played and scoring 10 goals.

Club career

Washington Spirit (2016–2019)
Matthews was drafted by Washington Spirit in the 1st round of the 2016 NWSL College Draft. She signed with the Spirit in April 2016. In her rookie season, Matthews played in 17 regular season games, 8 starts, totaling 779 minutes and scored three goals. The Georgia native scored her first professional goal on 31 July 2016 against Sky Blue FC.  The team went on to make its first ever NWSL Championship appearance, ultimately losing on penalties to Western New York Flash. Matthews dressed but served as an unused substitute.

The Spirit would struggle in the 2017 season but Matthews became a regular contributor making 21 appearances and scoring 5 goals (tied for second on the team).

Matthews sat out the 2018 season due to pregnancy.

Ahead of the 2020 season, the Spirit announced that Matthews would be taking a paid leave of absence to focus on her family situation, notably the potential for her husband, Jordan Matthews, to relocate within the NFL. The paid leave was anticipated to last until May of the year and stipulated that Matthews could continue her career elsewhere, if necessary.

In October 2020, Matthews was placed on the NWSL Re-Entry Wire by the Spirit.

Racing Louisville FC (2020–present)
In November 2020, Matthews was selected off the NWSL Re-Entry Wire by Racing Louisville FC.

International career
Matthews represented the United States at under–23 level in 2015. She was also eligible to play for Jamaica through her mother, who was born in Portland Parish. In January 2019, she was called up by the Reggae Girlz for the first time, joining the team in a training camp to prepare the first FIFA Women's World Cup appearance in Jamaica history. She made her debut in a 1–0 friendly win against Chile on 28 February 2019.

Matthews was selected for Jamaica's 2019 FIFA Women's World Cup squad. She made her World Cup debut during the team's first group stage match against Brazil in Grenoble.

Personal life
Matthews married San Francisco 49ers wide-receiver Jordan Matthews in February 2018 having met while both attended Vanderbilt University. The couple have two sons together, Josiah and Lionel.  Matthews is a Christian.

In March 2022, Matthews announced they were expected a third son.

References

External links
 

1993 births
Living people
Citizens of Jamaica through descent
Jamaican women's footballers
Women's association football forwards
Jamaica women's international footballers
2019 FIFA Women's World Cup players
People from Hampton, Georgia
Sportspeople from Lynn, Massachusetts
Soccer players from Georgia (U.S. state)
Soccer players from Massachusetts
American women's soccer players
Vanderbilt Commodores women's soccer players
Florida State Seminoles women's soccer players
Washington Spirit draft picks
Washington Spirit players
National Women's Soccer League players
21st-century African-American sportspeople
African-American women's soccer players
American sportspeople of Jamaican descent
Racing Louisville FC players
21st-century American women
21st-century African-American women